The Weaver Watermen's Association was a trade union in the United Kingdom. It was first registered in 1898 and was based in Winsford, Cheshire. Its total membership was in the low 400s for most of its existence. It merged with the Transport and General Workers' Union in 1926. Following its amalgamation its offices were moved to Norwich.

See also

 Transport and General Workers' Union
 TGWU amalgamations

References

Defunct trade unions of the United Kingdom
Maritime trade unions
Transport and General Workers' Union amalgamations
Trade unions established in 1898
Trade unions disestablished in 1926
Trade unions based in Cheshire